The New Zealand cricket team toured South Africa from 14 to 26 August 2015. The tour consisted of three One Day International and two Twenty20 International matches. In June Brendon McCullum was named as the captain for New Zealand on this tour. However, in July, it was announced that McCullum had been rested for this tour and the tour to Zimbabwe, being replaced by Kane Williamson.

South Africa won the ODI series 2–1 and the T20I series was drawn 1–1.

Squads

1 Ross Taylor was injured in training the day before the 3rd ODI against Zimbabwe and was ruled out of the rest of New Zealand's tour in Africa. Faf du Plessis was injured for the T20I series, so AB de Villiers captained South Africa. The injury ruled out du Plessis for the ODI and T20I series. Farhaan Behardien and Dean Elgar were added to the squad.

T20I series

1st T20I

2nd T20I

ODI series

1st ODI

2nd ODI

3rd ODI

References

External links
 Series home at ESPNCricinfo

2015 in New Zealand cricket
2015 in South African cricket
International cricket competitions in 2015
New Zealand cricket tours of South Africa